In the mathematical fields of order and domain theory, a Scott domain is an algebraic, bounded-complete cpo. They are named in honour of Dana S. Scott, who was the first to study these structures at the advent of domain theory. Scott domains are very closely related to algebraic lattices, being different only in possibly lacking a greatest element. They are also closely related to Scott information systems, which constitute a "syntactic" representation of Scott domains.

While the term "Scott domain" is widely used with the above definition, the term "domain" does not have such a generally accepted meaning and different authors will use different definitions; Scott himself used "domain" for the structures now called "Scott domains". Additionally, Scott domains appear with other names like "algebraic semilattice" in some publications.

Originally, Dana Scott demanded a complete lattice, and the Russian mathematician Yuri Yershov constructed the isomorphic structure of cpo.  But this was not recognized until after scientific communications improved after the fall of the Iron Curtain.  In honour of their work, a number of mathematical papers now dub this fundamental construction a "Scott–Ershov" domain.

Definition 

Formally, a non-empty partially ordered set  is called a Scott domain if the following hold:

  is directed complete, i.e. all directed subsets of  have a supremum.
  is bounded complete, i.e. all subsets of  that have some upper bound have a supremum.

Properties 

Since the empty set certainly has some upper bound, we can conclude the existence of a least element  (the supremum of the empty set) from bounded completeness.

It is well known that the existence of all infima implies the existence of all suprema and thus makes a partially ordered set into a complete lattice. Thus, when a top element (the infimum of the empty set) is adjoined to a Scott domain, one can conclude that:

 the new top element is compact (since the order was directed complete before) and
 the resulting poset will be an algebraic lattice (i.e. a complete lattice that is algebraic).

Consequently, Scott domains are in a sense "almost" algebraic lattices. However, removing the top element from a complete lattice does not always produce a Scott domain. (Consider the complete lattice .

Scott domains become topological spaces by introducing the Scott topology.

Explanation 

Scott domains are intended to represent partial algebraic data, ordered by information content. An element  is a piece of data that might not be fully defined. The statement  means " contains all the information that  does".

With this interpretation we can see that the supremum  of a subset  is the element that contains all the information that any element of  contains, but no more. Obviously such a supremum only exists (i.e., makes sense) provided  does not contain inconsistent information; hence the domain is directed and bounded complete, but not all suprema necessarily exist. The algebraicity axiom essentially ensures that all elements get all their information from (non-strictly) lower down in the ordering; in particular, the jump from compact or "finite" to non-compact or "infinite" elements does not covertly introduce any extra information that cannot be reached at some finite stage. The bottom element is the supremum of the empty set, i.e. the element containing no information at all; its existence is implied by bounded completeness, since, vacuously, the empty set has an upper bound in any non-empty poset.

In this way all non-empty infima exist, but not all infima are necessarily interesting.

This definition in terms of partial data allows an algebra to be defined as the limit of a sequence of increasingly more defined partial algebras—in other words a fixed point of an operator that adds progressively more information to the algebra. For more information, see Domain theory.

Examples 

 Every finite poset is directed complete and algebraic. Thus any bounded-complete finite poset trivially is a Scott domain.
 The natural numbers with an additional top element ω constitute an algebraic lattice, hence a Scott domain. For more examples in this direction, see the article on algebraic lattices.
 Consider the set of all finite and infinite words over the alphabet }, ordered by the prefix order on words. For example, . The empty word is the bottom element of this ordering, and every directed set (which is always a chain) is easily seen to have a supremum. Likewise, one immediately verifies bounded completeness. However, the resulting poset is certainly missing a top having many maximal elements instead (like 111... or 000...). It is also algebraic, since every finite word happens to be compact and we certainly can approximate infinite words by chains of finite ones. Thus this is a Scott domain which is not an algebraic lattice.
 For a negative example, consider the real numbers in the unit interval , ordered by their natural order. This bounded-complete cpo is not algebraic. In fact its only compact element is 0.

References

Literature 

See the literature given for domain theory.

Domain theory
Order theory